Haskew Brantley (September 28, 1922 – August 23, 2001) was an American politician. He served as a Republican member of the Georgia House of Representatives. He also served as a member for the 56th district of the Georgia State Senate.

Life and career 
Brantley was born in Jefferson County, Georgia. He attended Georgia Tech, and then served in the United States Army during the World War II and the Korean War.

In 1967, Brantley was elected to the Georgia House of Representatives, serving until 1974. In 1975, he was elected to represent the 56th district of the Georgia State Senate. He served until 1987, when he was succeeded by Sallie Newbill.

Brantley died in August 2001 at the Southeast Regional Hospital, at the age of 78.

References 

1922 births
2001 deaths
People from Jefferson County, Georgia
Republican Party Georgia (U.S. state) state senators
Republican Party members of the Georgia House of Representatives
20th-century American politicians
Georgia Tech alumni